Hephaestus (eight spellings) is the Greek god of blacksmiths, metalworking, carpenters, craftsmen, artisans, sculptors, metallurgy, fire (compare, however, with Hestia), and volcanoes. Hephaestus's Roman counterpart is Vulcan. In Greek mythology, Hephaestus was either the son of Zeus and Hera or he was Hera's parthenogenous child. He was cast off Mount Olympus by his mother Hera because of his lameness, the result of a congenital impairment; or in another account, by Zeus for protecting Hera from his advances (in which case his lameness would have been the result of his fall rather than the reason for it).

As a smithing god, Hephaestus made all the weapons of the gods in Olympus. He served as the blacksmith of the gods, and was worshipped in the manufacturing and industrial centres of Greece, particularly Athens. The cult of Hephaestus was based in Lemnos. Hephaestus's symbols are a smith's hammer, anvil, and a pair of tongs.

Etymology 
Hephaestus is probably associated with the Linear B (Mycenaean Greek) inscription , A-pa-i-ti-jo, found at Knossos. The inscription indirectly attests his worship at that time because it is believed that it reads the theophoric name (H)āpʰaistios, or Hāphaistion. The Greek theonym Hēphaistos is most likely of Pre-Greek origin, as the form without -i- (Attic Hēphastos) shows a typical Pre-Greek variation and points to an original sy.

Epithets 
Hephaestus is given many epithets. The meaning of each epithet is:
 Amphigyḗeis often translated as "the lame one"; literally "lame on both sides" vel sim.
 Kyllopodíōn "club-footed" or "of dragging feet"
 Khalkeús "coppersmith"
 Klytotékhnēs "renowned artificer"
 Polýmētis "shrewd, crafty" or "of many devices"
 Aitnaîos "Aetnaean", owing to his workshop being supposedly located below Mount Aetna.
Polýphrōn "ingenious, inventive" (Πολύφρων)
Agaklytós "very famous, glorious" (Ἀγακλυτός)
Aithalóeis theós "sooty god" (Αἰθαλόεις θεός)

Mythology

Craft of Hephaestus 

Hephaestus had his own palace on Olympus, containing his workshop with anvil and twenty bellows that worked at his bidding. Hephaestus crafted much of the magnificent equipment of the gods, and almost any finely wrought metalwork imbued with powers that appears in Greek myth is said to have been forged by Hephaestus. He designed Hermes' winged helmet and sandals, the Aegis breastplate, Aphrodite's famed girdle, Agamemnon's staff of office, Achilles' armour, Diomedes' cuirass, Heracles' bronze clappers, Helios' chariot, the shoulder of Pelops, and Eros's bow and arrows. In later accounts, Hephaestus worked with the help of the Cyclopes—among them his assistants in the forge, Brontes, Steropes and Arges.

He gave to the blinded Orion his apprentice Cedalion as a guide. In some versions of the myth, Prometheus stole the fire that he gave to man from Hephaestus's forge. Hephaestus also created the gift that the gods gave to man, the woman Pandora and her pithos. Being a skilled blacksmith, Hephaestus created all the thrones in the Palace of Olympus.

Automatons 
According to Homer, Hephaestus built automatons of metal to work for him or others. This included tripods with golden wheels, able to move at his wish in and out the assembly hall of the celestials; and servant "handmaidens wrought of gold in the semblance of living maids", in them was "understanding in their hearts, and speech and strength", gift of the gods. They moved to support Hephaestus while walking. And golden and silver lions and dogs at the entrance of the palace of Alkinoos in such a way that they could bite the invaders, guard dogs that didn't age nor perish. 

A similar golden dog (Κυων Χρυσεος) was set by Rhea to guard the infant Zeus and his nurse, the goat Amaltheia, on the island of Krete. Later Tantalus was said to have stolen the automata when it guarded Zeus' temple, or to have persuaded Pandareos to steal it for him. Later texts attempt to replace the automaton with the idea that the golden dog was actually Rhea, transformed in that way by Hephaestus.

Parentage 
 According to Homer (Iliad, I 571-577), Hera is mentioned as the mother of Hephaestus but there is not sufficient evidence to say that Zeus was his father (although he refers to him in such way).
 According to Homer (Odyssey, VIII 306), there is not sufficient evidence to say that Zeus was the father of Hephaestus (although he refers to him in such way). Hera is not mentioned as the mother.
 According to Hesiod (Theogony, 927-928), Hera gave birth to Hephaestus on her own as revenge for Zeus giving birth to Athena without her (Zeus lay with Metis).
 According to Pseudo-Apollodorus (Bibliotheca, 1.3.6), Hera gave birth to Hephaestus alone. Pseudo-Apollodorus also relates that, according to Homer, Hephaestus is one of the children of Zeus and Hera (consciously contradicting Hesiod and Homer).
 Several later texts follow Hesiod's account, including Hyginus and the preface to Fabulae.

In the account of Attic vase painters, Hephaestus was present at the birth of Athena and wields the axe with which he split Zeus' head to free her. In the latter account, Hephaestus is there represented as older than Athena, so the mythology of Hephaestus is inconsistent in this respect.

Fall from Olympus
In one branch of Greek mythology, Hera ejected Hephaestus from the heavens because of his congenital impairment. He fell into the ocean and was raised by Thetis (mother of Achilles and one of the 50 Nereids) and the Oceanid Eurynome.

In another account, Hephaestus, attempting to rescue his mother from Zeus' advances, was flung down from the heavens by Zeus. He fell for an entire day and landed on the island of Lemnos, where he was cared for and taught to be a master craftsman by the Sintians – an ancient tribe native to that island. Later writers describe his physical disability as the consequence of his second fall, while Homer makes him disabled from his birth.

Return to Olympus 

Hephaestus was one of the Olympians to have returned to Olympus after being exiled.

In an archaic story, Hephaestus gained revenge against Hera for rejecting him by making her a magical golden throne, which, when she sat on it, did not allow her to stand up again. The other gods begged Hephaestus to return to Olympus to let her go, but he refused, saying "I have no mother".

It was Ares who undertook the task of fetching Hephaestus at first, but he was threatened by the fire god with torches. At last, Dionysus, the god of wine, fetched him, intoxicated him with wine, and took the subdued smith back to Olympus on the back of a mule accompanied by revelers – a scene that sometimes appears on painted pottery of Attica and of Corinth. In the painted scenes, the padded dancers and phallic figures of the Dionysan throng leading the mule show that the procession was a part of the dithyrambic celebrations that were the forerunners of the satyr plays of fifth century Athens.

According to Hyginus, Zeus promised anything to Hephaestus in order to free Hera, and he asked for the hand of Athena in marriage (urged by Poseidon who was hostile toward her), leading to his attempted rape of her. In another version, he demanded to be married to Aphrodite in order to release Hera, and his mother fulfilled the request.

The theme of the return of Hephaestus, popular among the Attic vase-painters whose wares were favored among the Etruscans, may have introduced this theme to Etruria. In the vase-painters' portrayal of the procession, Hephaestus was mounted on a mule or a horse, with Dionysus holding the bridle and carrying Hephaestus' tools (including a double-headed axe).

The traveller Pausanias reported seeing a painting in the temple of Dionysus in Athens, which had been built in the 5th century but may have been decorated at any time before the 2nd century CE. When Pausanias saw it, he said:

Hephaestus and Aphrodite 

Though married to Hephaestus, Aphrodite had an affair with Ares, the god of war. Eventually, Hephaestus discovered Aphrodite's affair through Helios, the all-seeing Sun, and planned a trap during one of their trysts. While Aphrodite and Ares lay together in bed, Hephaestus ensnared them in an unbreakable chain-link net so small as to be invisible and dragged them to Mount Olympus to shame them in front of the other gods for retribution.

The gods laughed at the sight of these naked lovers, and Poseidon persuaded Hephaestus to free them in return for a guarantee that Ares would pay the adulterer's fine or that he would pay it himself. Hephaestus states in The Odyssey that he would return Aphrodite to her father and demand back his bride price. The Emily Wilson translation depicts Hephaestus demanding/imploring Zeus before Poseidon offers, however, leading the reader to assume Zeus did not give back the "price" Hephaestus paid for his daughter and was thus why Poseidon intervened.  Some versions of the myth state that Zeus did  not return the dowry, and in fact Aphrodite "simply charmed her way back again into her husband’s good graces." In the Iliad, Hephaestus is presented as divorced from Aphrodite, and now married to the Grace Aglaea. In the Theogony, Aglaea is presented as Hephaestus' mate with no apparent mention of any marriage to Aphrodite.

In a much later interpolated detail, Ares put the young soldier Alectryon, by their door to warn them of Helios's arrival as he suspected that Helios would tell Hephaestus of Aphrodite's infidelity if the two were discovered, but Alectryon fell asleep on guard duty. Helios discovered the two and alerted Hephaestus, as Ares in rage turned Alectryon into a rooster, which always crows at dawn when the sun is about to rise announcing its arrival.

The Thebans told that the union of Ares and Aphrodite produced Harmonia. However, of the union of Hephaestus with Aphrodite, there was no issue unless Virgil was serious when he said that Eros was their child. Later authors explain this statement by saying that Eros was sired by Ares but passed off to Hephaestus as his own son. Because Harmonia was conceived during Aphrodite's marriage to Hephaestus, for revenge, on Harmonia's wedding day to Cadmus Hephaestus gifted her with a finely worked but cursed necklace that brought immense suffering to her descendants, culminating with the story of Oedipus.

Hephaestus was somehow connected with the archaic, pre-Greek Phrygian and Thracian mystery cult of the Kabeiroi, who were also called the Hephaistoi, "the Hephaestus-men", in Lemnos. One of the three Lemnian tribes also called themselves Hephaestion and claimed direct descent from the god.

Hephaestus and Athena 
Hephaestus is to the male gods as Athena is to the female, for he gives skill to mortal artists and was believed to have taught men the arts alongside Athena. At Athens, they had temples and festivals in common. Both were believed to have great healing powers, and Lemnian earth (terra Lemnia) from the spot on which Hephaestus had fallen was believed to cure madness, the bites of snakes, and haemorrhage; and priests of Hephaestus knew how to cure wounds inflicted by snakes.

He was represented in the temple of Athena Chalcioecus (Athena of the Bronze House) at Sparta, in the act of delivering his mother; on the chest of Cypselus, giving Achilles's armor to Thetis; and at Athens there was the famous statue of Hephaestus by Alcamenes, in which his physical disability was only subtly portrayed.  He had almost "no cults except in Athens" and was possibly seen as a more approachable god to the city which shared her namesake. The Greeks frequently placed miniature statues of Hephaestus near their hearths, and these figures are the oldest of all his representations. During the best period of Grecian art he was represented as a vigorous man with a beard, and is characterized by his hammer or some other crafting tool, his oval cap, and the chiton.

Athena is sometimes thought to be the "soulmate" of Hephaestus. Nonetheless, he "seeks impetuously and passionately to make love to Athena: at the moment of climax she pushes him aside, and his semen falls to the earth where it impregnates Gaia."

Volcano god 
Some state that his origin myth was that of a "daemon of fire coming up from the earth"—that he was also associated with gas "which takes fire and burns [and] is considered by many people to be divine" and that only later was a volcano considered Hephaestus's smithy.

Hephaestus was associated by Greek colonists in southern Italy with the volcano gods Adranus (of Mount Etna) and Vulcanus of the Lipari islands. The first-century sage Apollonius of Tyana is said to have observed, "there are many other mountains all over the earth that are on fire, and yet we should never be done with it if we assigned to them giants and gods like Hephaestus".

Nevertheless, Hephaestus’ domain over fire goes back to Homer’s Iliad, where he uses flames to dry the waters of Scamandrus river and force its homonym deity, who was attacking Achilles, to retreat.

Other mythology 
In the Trojan war, Hephaestus sided with the Greeks, but was also worshiped by the Trojans and saved one of their men from being killed by Diomedes. Hephaestus' favourite place in the mortal world was the island of Lemnos, where he liked to dwell among the Sintians, but he also frequented other volcanic islands such as Lipari, Hiera, Imbros and Sicily, which were called his abodes or workshops.

Hephaestus fought against the Giants and killed Mimas by throwing molten iron at him. He also fought another Giant, Aristaeus, but he fled. During the battle Hephaestus fell down exhausted, and was picked up by Helios in his chariot. As a gift of gratitude, Hephaestus forged four ever-flowing fountains and fire-breathing bulls for Helios' son Aeëtes.

The epithets and surnames by which Hephaestus is known by the poets generally allude to his skill in the plastic arts or to his figure or disability. The Greeks frequently placed miniature statues of Hephaestus near their hearths, and these figures are the oldest of all his representations.

At the marriage of Peleus and Thetis he gave a knife as a wedding present.

Lovers, others and children
According to most versions, Hephaestus's consort is Aphrodite, who is unfaithful to Hephaestus with a number of gods and mortals, including Ares. However, in Book XVIII of Homer's Iliad, the consort of Hephaestus is Charis ("the grace") or Aglaia ("the glorious") – the youngest of the Graces, as Hesiod calls her.
 Károly Kerényi notes that "charis" also means "the delightfulness of art" and supposes that Aphrodite is viewed as a work of art, speculating that Aphrodite could also have been called Charis as an alternative name, for in the Odyssey Homer suddenly makes her his wife.

In Athens, there is a Temple of Hephaestus, the Hephaesteum (miscalled the "Theseum") near the agora. An Athenian founding myth tells that the city's patron goddess, Athena, refused a union with Hephaestus. Pseudo-Apollodorus records an archaic legend, which claims that Hephaestus once attempted to rape Athena, but she pushed him away, causing him to ejaculate on her thigh. Athena wiped the semen off using a tuft of wool, which she tossed into the dust, impregnating Gaia and causing her to give birth to Erichthonius, whom Athena adopted as her own child. The Roman mythographer Hyginus records a similar story in which Hephaestus demanded Zeus to let him marry Athena since he was the one who had smashed open Zeus's skull, allowing Athena to be born. Zeus agreed to this and Hephaestus and Athena were married, but, when Hephaestus was about to consummate the union, Athena vanished from the bridal bed, causing him to ejaculate on the floor, thus impregnating Gaia with Erichthonius.

On the island of Lemnos, Hephaestus' consort was the sea nymph Cabeiro, by whom he was the father of two metalworking gods named the Cabeiri. In Sicily, his consort was the nymph Aetna, and his sons were two gods of Sicilian geysers called Palici. With Thalia, Hephaestus was sometimes considered the father of the Palici.

Hephaestus fathered several children with mortals and immortals alike. One of those children was the robber Periphetes.

In addition, the Romans claim their equivalent god, Vulcan, to have produced the following children:
 Cacus (Cacus was mentioned also as a child of Hephaestus)
 Caeculus

Symbolism 

Hephaestus was sometimes portrayed as a vigorous man with a beard and was characterized by his hammer or some other crafting tool, his oval cap, and the chiton.

Hephaestus is described in mythological sources as "lame", and "halting".
He was depicted with curved feet, an impairment he had either from birth or as a result of his fall from Olympus. In vase paintings, Hephaestus is sometimes shown bent over his anvil, hard at work on a metal creation, and sometimes his feet are curved back-to-front: Hephaistos amphigyēeis. He walked with the aid of a stick. The Argonaut Palaimonius, "son of Hephaestus" (i.e. a bronze-smith) also had a mobility impairment.

Other "sons of Hephaestus" were the Cabeiri on the island of Samothrace, who were identified with the crab (karkinos) by the lexicographer Hesychius. The adjective karkinopous ("crab-footed") signified "lame", according to Detienne and Vernant. The Cabeiri were also physically disabled.

In some myths, Hephaestus built himself a "wheeled chair" or chariot with which to move around, thus helping support his mobility while demonstrating his skill to the other gods. In the Iliad 18.371, it is stated that Hephaestus built twenty bronze wheeled tripods to assist him in moving around.

Hephaestus's appearance and physical disability are taken by some to represent peripheral neuropathy and skin cancer resulting from arsenicosis caused by arsenic exposure from metalworking. Bronze Age smiths added arsenic to copper to produce harder arsenical bronze, especially during periods of tin scarcity. Many Bronze Age smiths would have suffered from chronic arsenic poisoning as a result of their livelihood. Consequently, the mythic image of the disabled smith is widespread. As Hephaestus was an iron-age smith, not a bronze-age smith, the connection is one from ancient folk memory.

Comparative mythology 
Parallels in other mythological systems for Hephaestus's symbolism include:
 The Ugarit craftsman-god Kothar-wa-Khasis, who is identified from afar by his distinctive walk – possibly suggesting that he limps.
 As Herodotus was given to understand, the Egyptian craftsman-god Ptah was a dwarf god and is often depicted naked.
 In Norse mythology, Weyland the Smith was a physically disabled bronzeworker.
 In Hinduism the artificer god Tvastr fills a similar role, albeit more positively portrayed.
 The Ossetian god Kurdalagon may share a similar origin.
 In Enochic literature, Azazel is one of the leaders of the rebellious Watchers in the time preceding the Flood; he taught men the art of warfare, of making swords, knives, shields, and coats of mail,

Worship 
Solinus wrote that the Lycians dedicated a city to Hephaestus and called it Hephaestia.
The Hephaestia in Lemnos was named after the god.
In addition, the whole island of Lemnos was sacred to Hephaestus.

Pausanias wrote that the Lycians in Patara had a bronze bowl in their temple of Apollo, saying that Telephus dedicated it and Hephaestus made it.

Pausanias also wrote that the village of Olympia in Elis contained an altar to the river Alpheios, next to which was an altar to Hephaestus sometimes referred to as the altar of "Warlike Zeus."

The island Thermessa, between Lipari and Sicily was also called Hiera of Hephaestus (ἱερὰ Ἡφαίστου), meaning sacred place of Hephaestus in Greek.

Namesakes 
Pliny the Elder wrote that at Corycus there was a stone which was called Hephaestitis or Hephaestus stone. According to Pliny, the stone was red and was reflecting images like a mirror, and when boiling water poured over it cooled immediately or alternatively when it placed in the sun it immediately set fire to a parched substance.

The minor planet 2212 Hephaistos discovered in 1978 by Soviet astronomer Lyudmila Chernykh was named in Hephaestus' honour.

The sooty grunter (Hephaestus fuliginosus), a dark, typically sooty-coloured freshwater fish of the family Terapontidae found in northern Australia, is named after Hephaestus.

Genealogy

See also 

 Family tree of the Greek gods
 Hephaestus in popular culture

Notes

References

Bibliography

Ancient 
 Homer, The Iliad with an English Translation by A.T. Murray, PhD in two volumes. Cambridge, MA., Harvard University Press; London, William Heinemann, Ltd. 1924. Online version at the Perseus Digital Library.
 Homer; The Odyssey with an English Translation by A.T. Murray, PH.D. in two volumes. Cambridge, MA., Harvard University Press; London, William Heinemann, Ltd. 1919. Online version at the Perseus Digital Library.
 Hesiod, Theogony, in The Homeric Hymns and Homerica with an English Translation by Hugh G. Evelyn-White, Cambridge, MA., Harvard University Press; London, William Heinemann Ltd. 1914. Online version at the Perseus Digital Library.
 Evelyn-White, Hugh, The Homeric Hymns and Homerica with an English Translation by Hugh G. Evelyn-White. Homeric Hymns. Cambridge, Massachusetts, Harvard 
 Apollonius of Rhodes,  Argonautica; with an English translation by R. C. Seaton. William Heinemann, 1912.
 Apollodorus, Apollodorus, The Library, with an English Translation by Sir James George Frazer, F.B.A., F.R.S. in 2 Volumes. Cambridge, MA, Harvard University Press; London, William Heinemann Ltd. 1921. Online version at the Perseus Digital Library.
 Pausanias, Pausanias Description of Greece with an English Translation by W.H.S. Jones, Litt.D., and H.A. Ormerod, M.A., in 4 Volumes. Cambridge, MA, Harvard University Press; London, William Heinemann Ltd. 1918. Online version at the Perseus Digital Library.
 Strabo, The Geography of Strabo. Edition by H.L. Jones. Cambridge, Mass.: Harvard University Press; London: William Heinemann, Ltd. 1924. Online version at the Perseus Digital Library.
 Ovid, Ovid's Fasti: With an English translation by Sir James George Frazer, London: W. Heinemann LTD; Cambridge, Massachusetts, Harvard University Press, 1959. Internet Archive.
 Hyginus, Gaius Julius, The Myths of Hyginus. Edited and translated by Mary A. Grant, Lawrence: University of Kansas Press, 1960.

Modern 

 
 Slater, Philip Elliot (1968), The Glory of Hera: Greek Mythology and the Greek Family, Princeton, New Jersey: Princeton University Press, . Google books.
 Stein, Murray, Soul: Treatment and Recovery: The selected works of Murray Stein, Routledge, 2015. .
 Strabo, Geography, translated by Horace Leonard Jones; Cambridge, Massachusetts: Harvard University Press; London: William Heinemann, Ltd. (1924). LacusCurtis, Online version at the Perseus Digital Library, Books 6–14.

External links

 Theoi Project, Hephaestus in classical literature and art
 Greek Mythology Link, Hephaestus summary of the myths of Hephaestus

Greek gods
 
Fire gods
Smithing gods
Volcano gods
Mythological rapists
Children of Hera
Consorts of Aphrodite
Deities in the Iliad
Deeds of Athena
Crafts gods
Deeds of Poseidon
Children of Zeus
Characters in the Odyssey
Metamorphoses characters
Metalsmiths
Consorts of Gaia
Helios in mythology
Deeds of Aphrodite
Twelve Olympians
Deeds of Hera
Deeds of Ares